Courtney Hadwin is an English singer-songwriter. She rose to fame by competing prominently on ITV's The Voice Kids UK 2017 and the 13th season of the NBC competition show America's Got Talent.

Early and personal life
She lives in Hesleden, England, with her parents, younger sister Melissa, and younger brother Paul. She attended Hesleden Primary School and until autumn 2018 studied at The Academy at Shotton Hall in Peterlee. She has also trained at Shotton Hall Theatre School, Peanuts Master Classes, Kate Sirs School of Music and Julie Miles' Vocal Ovation.

Hadwin was a 2018 finalist on TV's America's Got Talent. She previously appeared on the first series of The Voice Kids in the UK and afterwards on America's Got Talent: The Champions.

Career

Early performances
In April 2015, Hadwin auditioned for her first singing competition at TeenStar in Newcastle, England, with her version of Bob Dylan's "Make You Feel My Love", and reached the competition's grand final. She also gained notice when she was filmed performing Great Big World and Christina Aguilera's soaring duet "Say Something" in September 2015. In April 2016, she won Hartlepool's Performer of the Year Award, and was a finalist in the Beyond The Lights award ceremony. She was the opening act for Sister Sledge at a South Tyneside Festival concert in July 2017, where she sang for more than 18,000 people. In January 2018, she sang in Southampton at an event for U-Support, raising funds for children with life-limiting illnesses and disabilities.

2017: The Voice Kids UK
Hadwin blind-auditioned for The Voice Kids UK, where she performed Tina Turner's "Nutbush City Limits". She was picked by Judge Danny Jones, who became her mentor on the show. During the battle round, she performed "Dancing in the Street" against Eboni Green and Hollie Firmin. For her semi-final performance, she sang James Brown's "I Got You (I Feel Good)". For her final performance on 16 July 2017, she sang the torch song "And I Am Telling You I'm Not Going", from the Broadway musical Dreamgirls, before being eliminated as a finalist.

2018–2019: America's Got Talent
In her audition for the 13th season of America's Got Talent, Hadwin sang Otis Redding's "Hard to Handle". The performance inspired judge Howie Mandel to give her a Golden Buzzer, sending her straight to the live shows. Mandel compared Hadwin's singing to Janis Joplin. The audition video received more than 50 million views on AGTs YouTube channel in its first five months. Hadwin returned for AGT's quarter-finals on 14 August 2018, singing "Papa's Got a Brand New Bag" by James Brown. For her semi-final performance on 11 September, she sang "Born to Be Wild" by Steppenwolf, then returned for the final show on 18 September to perform Tina Turner's "River Deep – Mountain High". On the results show on 19 September, she sang "Piece of My Heart" with rock band The Struts. Although she failed to win AGT's grand prize, she went on to Las Vegas to do five live shows with winner Shin Lim at the Paris Hotel and Casino from 2–4 November 2018.

In December 2018, Hadwin signed a record deal with Syco Entertainment and Arista Records. 

In 2019, Hadwin appeared as a contestant on NBC's America's Got Talent: The Champions, where she performed her first original song, "Pretty Little Thing". She has been named as one of the 50 top contestants in all the AGT shows across 194 countries.

2019–present: Pandemic Hiatus and Debut as Singer/Songwriter

Following her performance of her original song "Pretty Little Thing" on AGT: The Champions, Hadwin's first EP appeared on 25 October 2019 titled "The Cover Sessions", which include live covers of "Sign of the Times" by Harry Styles, "Old Town Road" by Lil Nas X, "Sucker" by the Jonas Brothers, and "Someone You Loved" by Lewis Capaldi. She has been described as "an exceptional talent with a voice and spirit well beyond her years." When an interviewer asked her about her artistic influences, she said, "From Little Richard, James Brown to Janis Joplin, Mick Jagger.... It's a really long list!"

The COVID-19 pandemic severely limited the live performance of music, causing, or contributing to, the cancellation of many planned music festivals and concert tours, and releases of new albums, for years.   During this hiatus, Hadwin released a cover of John Lennon's song "Happy Xmas (War Is Over)" on November 20, 2020 to both YouTube and music streaming services.  

On February 24, 2023, Hadwin released her new original Single, "Breakable", written by her and Kevin Bowe, her producer, on both YouTube and music streaming services.  Apparently, during this period, Hadwin parted company with the label which inherited her account after Simon Cowell's Syco Music label ceased operations, as evidenced by a comment from Hadwin in response to a fan's (YouTube user 'Hal Dayley') comment mentioning 'Simon' on her YouTube channel post of her latest music video, 'Breakable', to which she responded "It’s all me for this one completely independent finally doing it MY WAY".

Discography
 2019 The Cover Sessions
 2020 Happy Xmas (the war is over)
 2023 Breakable

References

External links

Courtney Hadwin on Instagram
Courtney Hadwin on Facebook
Courtney Hadwin on YouTube
Courtney Hadwin VEVO on YouTube

English child singers
People from Hartlepool
People from Peterlee
Musicians from County Durham
America's Got Talent contestants
Living people
21st-century English women singers
21st-century English singers
Year of birth missing (living people)